Aleksandra Mirjana Mona Janković (born 29 April 1988), professionally known as YANX, Sashka Yanx and Miss Jukebox, is a  Serbian singer-songwriter, producer and more. She was previously a backing vocalist for numerous other artists, including Milan Stanković at the Eurovision Song Contest 2010, Nina Radojičić at the Eurovision Song Contest 2011 and Bojana Stamenov at the Eurovision Song Contest 2015. In 2012, Janković participated in Prvi glas Srbije, a musical talent show similar to The Voice.

Life and career

Early life and career: 1988–2009 
Janković was born in 1988 in Smederevo (Yugoslavia then, Serbia now). When she was a child, she started playing the violin, but later switched to the piano. Janković cited jazz, pop and rock music as her musical influences. As a teenager, she participated in the RTS talents competition 3K dur. Janković then on to compete at the SunFlower Festival in Zrenjanin in 2006 and 2007, the 2007 Art Zone Festival in Bulgaria, and the 2008 PAN Music Festival, where she was honoured as the Best Newcomer.

Career development: 2009–11 
In March 2009, Janković took part in the Beovizija 2009, Serbian national selection for the Eurovision Song Contest 2009, with the song "Nauči me". The semifinal event was held on March 8. In the final, Janković performed the fourth and finished the eighth with six points. On 18 April 2009, she performed at the humanitarian concert "Darujte život" (English: Give Life) in Smederevo. On 1 July, Janković performed "Bože pravde", the national anthem of Serbia, alongside two more singers at the opening ceremony of the 2009 Summer Universiade, which was held in Belgrade. She would also sing the "Bože pravde" at the reception of Serbia national basketball team who had won the silver medal at the EuroBasket 2009.

In May 2010, Janković sang backing vocals for Milan Stanković at the Eurovision Song Contest 2010. Along with Nikola Sarić, she took part in the Sunčane Skale Festival in Herceg Novi, Montenegro, with the song "Uhvati dan" (English: Seize the Day). In December, Janković performed "Bože pravde" at the celebration honouring the Serbia Davis Cup team's win of the 2010 Davis Cup. In 2011, she once again sang backing vocals at the Eurovision Song Contest, this time for Nina Radojičić. In June, Janković acted as a member of the jury at the talents competition Staropramen. She also performed along with the pianist and composer Aleksandar Saša Lokner at the Summer at Gardoš Festival in August.

Upcoming studio album and Prvi glas Srbije: 2011–present 
In December 2011, Janković officially adopted "Miss Jukebox" as her artistic name, and announced the release of her new single "Nikome nije lako". The video for the song features popular Serbian musicians such as Dragoljub Đuričić, Vukašin Brajić and Nikola Sarić.

In 2012, Janković participated in the second season of the talent show Prvi glas Srbije (The First Voice of Serbia), adapted from The Voice. She successfully went through the blind audition and the battle phase to progress to the live performances. However, Janković was eliminated in the sixth round of live performances, having received fewest public votes. She had previously once been nominated for elimination, but was saved by the judges Vlado Georgiev, Aleksandra Radović and Saša Milošević Mare. While on Prvi glas Srbije, Janković performed live the following songs:
 Vasilija Radojčić — "Mito bekrijo"
 Šaban Bajramović — "Đelem, đelem"
 Jennifer Lopez feat. Pitbull — "Dance Again"
 Negative — "Zbunjena"
 Celine Dion — "Because You Loved Me"
 Christina Aguilera, Pink, Lil' Kim and Mýa — "Lady Marmalade"
 Smak — "Daire" / Jennifer Hudson — "One Night Only"

On 25 December 2012, three days after Janković had been eliminated from Prvi glas Srbije, Jennifer Hudson tweeted, "@Miss_Jukebox great job", praising her performance of "One Night Only". In January 2013, Janković released her new single "Ćošak" (English: Corner).

In February 2013, Janković took part in Beosong 2013, Serbian national election for the Eurovision Song Contest 2013, with the song "Duga u tvojim očima" (English: The Rainbow in Your Eyes). In the competition she reached third place.

In 2018, she once again tried to represent Serbia at Eurovision Song Contest 2018 with the song Pesma za tebe.
She came 2nd at the preselection, Beovizija 2018. She returned to Beovizija in  2019 with her song Da Li Čuješ Moj Glas and got the 3rd place.

Personal life 
Janković's father, Dobrica Janković, was a member of the Serbian parliament from 2004 to 2007.

Janković stated she was "very attracted" to learning foreign language and that she would like to study Portuguese. She eventually enrolled journalism at the University of Belgrade.

Discography

Singles 
 2009 — "Nauči me"
 2010 — "Uhvati dan" (feat. Nikola Sarić)
 2011 — "Nikome nije lako"
 2013 — "Ćošak"
 2013 — "Duga u tvojim očima"
 2013 — "Ono kad"
 2014 -- "Ponekad"
 2014 -- "Spavaj"
 2018 -- "Pesma za tebe"

Other songs 
 2010 — "Ovo je Balkan"
 2011 — "Čaroban"

Awards and nominations

See also 
 Beovizija 2009
 Serbia in the Eurovision Song Contest
 Prvi glas Srbije
 Prvi glas Srbije (series 2)
 Serbia in the Eurovision Song Contest 2009
 Serbia in the Eurovision Song Contest 2010
 Serbia in the Eurovision Song Contest 2011
 Serbia in the Eurovision Song Contest 2013
 Serbia in the Eurovision Song Contest 2019

References

External links 
 Official Website
 Miss Jukebox on Twitter

1988 births
Women rock singers
Living people
Singers from Belgrade
Musicians from Smederevo
21st-century Serbian women singers
Serbian pop singers
Serbian rock singers
Serbian singer-songwriters
Serbian television personalities
Beovizija contestants